The 1947–48 OB I bajnokság season was the 11th season of the OB I bajnokság, the top level of ice hockey in Hungary. Six teams participated in the league, and MTK Budapest won the championship.

Regular season

External links
 Season on hockeyarchives.info

Hun
OB I bajnoksag seasons
1947–48 in Hungarian ice hockey